Hyo-joo, also spelled Hyo-ju, is a Korean feminine given name.

People with this name include:
Park Hyo-joo (born 1982), South Korean actress
An Hyo-ju (born 1987), South Korean field hockey player
Han Hyo-joo (born 1987), South Korean actress
Kim Hyo-joo (born 1995), South Korean golfer

See also
List of Korean given names

Korean feminine given names